Ian Hugh James (born July 17, 1963) is a former long jumper, born in Port of Spain, Trinidad and Tobago, who represented Canada in two consecutive Summer Olympics, starting in 1988 in Seoul, South Korea. A resident of Mississauga, Ontario, he won the bronze medal in the men's long jump at the 1994 Commonwealth Games.

References
 Canadian Olympic Committee

1963 births
Living people
Sportspeople from Port of Spain
Trinidad and Tobago emigrants to Canada
Canadian male long jumpers
Athletes (track and field) at the 1988 Summer Olympics
Athletes (track and field) at the 1992 Summer Olympics
Athletes (track and field) at the 1987 Pan American Games
Athletes (track and field) at the 1995 Pan American Games
Athletes (track and field) at the 1994 Commonwealth Games
Olympic track and field athletes of Canada
Athletes from Mississauga
Commonwealth Games medallists in athletics
Commonwealth Games bronze medallists for Canada
Pan American Games track and field athletes for Canada
Medallists at the 1994 Commonwealth Games